This is the list of governors of the Brazilian state of Acre.

Governors elected during the Fourth Republic

Governors appointed by the military

Governors elected during the Sixth Republic

References 

Acre